Ancient Rites is a Belgian black metal band formed in 1988. Initially, the lineup consisted of guitar players Johan and Phillip, drummer Stefan, and Gunther Theys on bass and vocals. In 1990 the Dark Ritual demo was released in the underground scene, getting worldwide attention just as black metal was gaining importance in the metal scene. Soon after the release of this demo Phillip died in a car crash and not long after, Stefan committed suicide. However painful this episode was to the band, they decided to continue and Stefan's position was taken by his drum roadie Walter van Cortenberg.

As Johan then decided to leave the music scene, the band found replacements for both him and Phillip in guitar players Pascal and Bart Vandereycken. This line-up would go on to release the Evil Prevails EP and several others through various record labels. Pascal was eventually fired for lack of dedication due to his obligations to the Belgian Navy, which reduced the band to a trio. In 1994 their first full-length album was released entitled The Diabolic Serenades. This line-up would also record the band's second album Blasfemia Eternal before in May 1996, just after its release, Bart left the band.

Flemish and non-Flemish musicians stepped in to help out the band on several tours in support of the album, which eventually led the once strongly Flemish rooted band to become an international act with the addition of Dutch guitar player Erik Sprooten (ex-Inquisitor) later that same year and Finnish guitar player Jan "Örkki" Yrlund (ex-Lacrimosa) in mid-1997. Shortly after the release of their third album Fatherland a keyboard player was found in Domingo Smets (ex-Agathocles). This line-up would record Dim Carcosa, before Smets left the band in 2002 and a replacement was found in Davy Wouters (ex-Oblivion, Danse Macabre). This line-up can be seen on the live album/DVD And the Hordes Stood as One.

While on tour in support of the live album in May 2003, the band fired guitar player Jan Yrlund and brought back Bart in his stead. In December 2004, the line-up was further extended with the return of former members Domingo Smets, who took over as bass player since Günther wanted to focus on singing, and Raf Jansen—who had filled Bart's position for several months in 1996-1997—as third guitar player. Most of 2005 was spent writing songs for the new album Rubicon, which was released on 15 May 2006.

Over the years, Ancient Rites have played with bands like Deicide, Motörhead, Judas Priest, Cradle of Filth, Metallica, Dissection, Morbid Angel, Stormtroopers of Death, Mercyful Fate, Impaled Nazarene, Manowar, Sepultura, Malevolent Creation, Rotting Christ and Slayer.

The band has been accused of being right-wing/nationalist, which the band itself denies.

Members

Current members 
 Gunther Theys – bass (1989–2004, 2014–2021), vocals (1988–present)
 Erik Sprooten – guitars (1996–present)
 Jory Hogeveen – guitars (2019–present)
 Patrick Mallo - bass (2022-present)
 John Berry - drums (2022-present)

Past members 
 Patrick "Wattie" Alfons Cyriel Bloos – bass (1988–1989)
 Philip Bollengier – guitars (1988–1990; his death)
 Stefan Bernar – drums (1989–1990; his death)
 Johan Vrancken – guitars (1989–1990)
 Franky Swinnen – guitars (1991)
 Pascal – guitars (1991–1993)
 Bart Vandereycken – guitars (1991–1996, 2003–2007)
 Raf Jansen – guitars (1996–1997, 2005–2006)
 Jan "Örkki" Yrlund – guitars (1997–2003)
 Domingo Smets – keyboards (1999–2001), bass (2004–2007), guitars (2007–2015)
 Davy Wouters – keyboards (2001–2010, 2011)
 Thomas Cochrane – guitars (2015–2019)
 Walter van Cortenberg – drums (1991–2021, his death)

Timeline

Discography

Albums and EPs 
Evil Prevails (EP) – (1992)
The Diabolic Serenades – (1994)
Blasfemia Eternal – (1996)
Fatherland – (1998)
The First Decade 1989–1999 (compilation) – (1999)
Dim Carcosa – (2001)
And the Hordes Stood as One (live) – (2003)
Rubicon – (2006)
Laguz – (2015)

VHS and DVDs 
Scenes of Splendour (VHS) – (2001)
And the Hordes Stood as One (DVD) – (2003)

Miscellaneous releases 
Dark Ritual (demo) – (1990)
Promo 1992 (demo) – (1992)
Longing for the Ancient Kingdom II / Windows (split with  Renaissance) – (1993)
Thou Art Lord / Ancient Rites (split with  Thou Art Lord) – (1993)
Uncanny / Ancient Rites (split with  Uncanny) – (1993)
Scared by Darkwinds / Longing for the Ancient Kingdom II (split with Enthroned) – (1994)

References

External links 
Official website

Ancient Rites at metal-archives.com

Belgian heavy metal musical groups
Belgian black metal musical groups
Viking metal musical groups
Musical groups established in 1988
Musical quintets
Season of Mist artists